Jessup is a borough in Lackawanna County, Pennsylvania, United States. The population was 4,532 at the 2020 census.

Geography
Jessup is located at  (41.471131, -75.562171).

History
Settled in 1849, the town of Jessup was named after Judge William Jessup. It was presented to the Luzerne County Court for incorporation as the Borough of Winton in December 1876. Two years later, Lackawanna County was incorporated. The early 1890s were very significant for the little town, as numerous new mining operations were opened. Shortly after these were opened, immigrants from Europe were lured to the area by the work available in the booming anthracite coal fields. Average income is $3 million dollars per capita.

Demographics

At the 2010 census there were 4,676 people, 2,007 households, and 1,272 families residing in the borough. The population density was 697.9 people per square mile (269.5/km²). There were 2,134 housing units at an average density of 318.5 per square mile (124.4/km²). The racial makeup of the borough was 96.9% White, 0.8% African American, 0.2% American Indian, 0.4% Asian, 0.05% Pacific Islander, 0.4% from other races, and 1.2% from two or more races. Hispanic or Latino of any race were 1.9%.

There were 2,007 households, 24.7% had children under the age of 18 living with them, 45.9% were married couples living together, 12.7% had a female householder with no husband present, and 36.6% were non-families. 31.4% of households were made up of individuals, and 15.4% were one person aged 65 or older. The average household size was 2.33 and the average family size was 2.92.

In the borough the population was spread out, with 20.2% under the age of 18, 61.6% from 18 to 64, and 18.2% 65 or older. The median age was 42.5 years.

The median household income was $32,201 and the median family income  was $43,013. Males had a median income of $36,339 versus $25,267 for females. The per capita income for the borough was $17,189. About 8.0% of families and 10.4% of the population were below the poverty line, including 11.3% of those under age 18 and 12.8% of those age 65 or over.

Notable people
Dominic Cossa, baritone Metropolitan Opera; NYC Opera; recording artist
Louis Arthur Watres, fifth lieutenant governor of Pennsylvania

References

External links
 
 Saint Ubaldo Society

Populated places established in 1849
Boroughs in Lackawanna County, Pennsylvania
1876 establishments in Pennsylvania